Conospermum teretifolium, commonly known as the spider smokebush, is a shrub endemic to Western Australia.

It blooms between August and January producing cream-white flowers.

It is found along the south coast in the South West, Great Southern and Goldfields-Esperance regions of Western Australia where it grows in sandy soils over granite or laterite.

References

External links

Eudicots of Western Australia
teretifolium
Endemic flora of Western Australia
Plants described in 1810
Taxa named by Robert Brown (botanist, born 1773)